Khomruduiyeh (also Romanized as Khomrūdū’īyeh and Khamardoo’eyeh; also known as Amrū’īyeh (Persian: امروئيه), Amredū’īyeh, Amroodiyeh Soosafid, Amrūdīyeh, Amrūdīyeh-ye Sū Sefīd, and Khomrūt) is a village in Hotkan Rural District, in the Central District of Zarand County, Kerman Province, Iran. At the 2006 census, its population was 16, in 7 families.

References 

Populated places in Zarand County